Parliamentary elections were held in Madagascar on 15 December 2002. They were won by the Tiako I Madagasikara party of President Marc Ravalomanana, which took 103 of the 160 seats. Voter turnout was 67.86% of the 5,844,564 registered voters.

Results

References

Elections in Madagascar
Madagascar
2002 in Madagascar
December 2002 events in Africa
Election and referendum articles with incomplete results